Quriqucha (Quechua quri gold, qucha lake, "gold lake", hispanicized spelling Coricocha, Qoricocha) is a lake in Peru located in the Cusco Region, Calca Province, Coya District. Quriqucha lies west of the Willkanuta River and the little town Taray.

References 

Lakes of Peru
Lakes of Cusco Region